Ohara Dam is a gravity dam located in Fukui Prefecture in Japan. The dam is used for power production. The catchment area of the dam is 12.8 km2. The dam impounds about 2  ha of land when full and can store 152 thousand cubic meters of water. The construction of the dam was started on 1963 and completed in 1964.

References

Dams in Fukui Prefecture
1964 establishments in Japan